Frank is a 2014 independent black comedy film directed by Lenny Abrahamson, produced by David Barron, Ed Guiney and Stevie Lee and written by Jon Ronson and Peter Straughan. It stars Michael Fassbender, Domhnall Gleeson, Maggie Gyllenhaal, Scoot McNairy, and François Civil.

The film premiered at the 2014 Sundance Film Festival. It was released theatrically in Ireland and Britain on 9 May 2014 and on DVD and On-Demand on 12 September 2014.

Plot
While walking along the beach in his hometown, aspiring songwriter Jon Burroughs witnesses a man named Lucas trying to drown himself. As Lucas is taken to the hospital, Jon meets Don, who explains that Lucas was the keyboardist for a band called The Soronprfbs, which Don manages. After mentioning that he plays keyboards, Jon is invited to perform with them that night. The Soronprfbs’ drummer Nana, synthesizer and theremin player Clara, and guitarist Baraque are reluctant to accept Jon, but he is warmly welcomed by lead vocalist Frank, who always wears a papier-mâché mask over his head. Their performance abruptly ends when Clara storms off the stage after being shocked by an electrical fault.

Frank invites Jon to be part of a Soronprfbs project. He agrees and accompanies them to a remote cabin in Ireland, believing it would take a couple of days just to realise that it actually would take a whole year while they work on recording their debut album. One day, Don confesses to Jon that he feels he cannot live up to Frank's prowess. The next day, Don reveals they are being evicted from the cabin, but Jon offers to pay the outstanding rent using his grandfather's inheritance. After completing the album, the band finds what appears to be Frank's corpse hanging from a tree, but discover it is actually Don once they remove the mask. They cremate him, and Clara reveals to Jon that Don was the original keyboardist of the band, hinting that Jon would die too sooner or later.

Jon reveals that he has been secretly uploading the band's recording sessions on social media, earning them a small fan following and an invitation to perform at South by Southwest. Most of the band is offended by Jon's clandestine promotion of them, but Frank, excited by the prospect of a large audience, agrees to go to the festival. Clara confronts Jon as the latter is soaking in the hot tub, expressing contempt for his growing influence over Frank. The ensuing argument culminates in them having angry sex, and Clara threatens to stab him if the trip to America goes awry.

Leading up to the performance, the band begins to argue over creative differences. Clara and Frank disappear shortly before the concert and Jon finds them in an alley, where Clara is helping Frank stave off a mental breakdown. Jon tries to get Frank to go back to the festival with him, prompting Clara to stab him in the leg as promised. After she is arrested, Jon uses the scandal to build publicity for the band. The night before the concert, Nana and Baraque, always disdainful towards Jon, quit the band. Jon and Frank go onstage by themselves in spite of Frank's deteriorating mental health. When Jon tries to begin the set with one of his own songs rather than one from the album, Frank has a breakdown and collapses on stage. They move into a cheap motel together, where a frustrated Jon tries to forcibly unmask Frank. Frank tries to escape and is hit by a car, smashing the fake head. He flees before Jon can see his real face.

Sometime later, Jon visits a dive bar where Clara, Nana, and Baraque are playing as a trio, and apologizes to them for having taken control of the band. After numerous failed attempts, he finally succeeds in tracking Frank to his hometown of Bluff City, Kansas, where he is living with his parents. Frank is scarred and balding from prolonged use of the mask. Frank’s parents explain that he has suffered from severe mental health issues all his life and began wearing the mask as a teenager after his dad made it for him for an alleged costume party, but that he has always been musically talented. Frank declares he has been unable to make music since the band fell apart. Jon takes Frank to the dive bar where the rest of the band is playing. They quickly realize who he is and join him as he begins to sing. With the original Soronprfbs restored, Jon leaves the bar alone.

Cast
 Michael Fassbender as Frank, the eccentric titular character and leader of the band who wears a large papier-mâché head throughout the film, similar to that worn by the late Frank Sidebottom. Director Lenny Abrahamson said that Fassbender was "very comfortable" wearing the head and said that he even enjoyed acting in it.
 Domhnall Gleeson as Jon Burroughs, a young wannabe musician who joins Frank's band.
 Maggie Gyllenhaal as Clara Wagner, Frank's often aggressive sidekick who plays a Korg MS-20 and a theremin. Gyllenhaal originally turned down the role, saying that she didn't understand it, but the story stuck with her and weeks later she changed her mind. Before filming started, Gyllenhaal decided to act as though Clara was Frank's true love but said that it was hard due to Frank's head.
 Scoot McNairy as Don, the band's manager, producer and sound engineer.
 Carla Azar as Nana, the band's drummer.
 François Civil as Baraque, the band's French guitar player.

Production
Frank is a fictional story mostly inspired by Frank Sidebottom, the comic persona of Chris Sievey who is thought to have given his backing to the film before his death, but the plot was also inspired by other musicians like Daniel Johnston and Captain Beefheart. Jon Ronson, who co-wrote the film, was part of Sidebottom's band, and the plot began as an adaptation of his writings but later became a fictional take on it. The film shot in County Wicklow, Dublin, and New Mexico in 2013.

Stephen Rennicks served as music director, tasked to write songs that were a hybrid of pop and experimental rock music. Rennicks was inspired by musicians he met while in his own 1980s band, the Prunes. He also wrote the score and supervised the recordings of his original songs. The music performed by the band in the film was recorded live by the cast while filming.

Release
The film premiered at the Sundance Film Festival on 17 January 2014. When audiences went to see the film at Sundance, they were all given masks similar to that worn by Frank in the film. The film premiered in Europe at its European premiere in Dublin on 25 April 2014. The film was released in cinemas nationwide in the Republic of Ireland and in the United Kingdom on 9 May 2014.

Reception
Frank received highly positive reviews from critics and has a rating of 92% on Rotten Tomatoes based on 163 reviews with a weighted average score of 7.46/10. The website's critical consensus states, "Funny, clever, and endearingly unusual, Frank transcends its quirky trappings with a heartfelt — and surprisingly thought-provoking — story." On review aggregator Metacritic, Frank has a score of 75 out of 100 based on 33 critics, signifying "generally favourable reviews".

The Daily Telegraphs Amber Wilkinson rated the film 4/5, calling it "off-beat and punk-spirited." Peter Bradshaw of The Guardian gave it four stars out of five, saying: "Frank works as satire, as memoir, as comedy bromance, but it works mostly because it is just so weird". Mark Kermode of The Observer named it one of the top five films of 2014. Kyle Smith of the New York Post described it as a "whimsical delight", saying it has a lot of heart, and commenting positively on Gleeson in particular. However, Smith also found it unfortunate that the film came "crashing down in a total bummer of a third act". Criticism for the film was largely based on how the plot developed towards its end.

In conjunction with the U.S. release of the film, Michael Fassbender made an appearance as Frank with his band on The Colbert Report.

Awards won

References

External links
 
 
 
 
  (rating 4/5)
 Frank, Official trailer at The Guardian

2014 films
2014 black comedy films
2014 comedy-drama films
British black comedy films
British comedy-drama films
Irish comedy-drama films
English-language Irish films
Films about music and musicians
Films based on newspaper and magazine articles
Films set in Dublin (city)
Films set in Austin, Texas
Films shot in Ireland
Films shot in New Mexico
Irish independent films
2014 independent films
Film4 Productions films
Films directed by Lenny Abrahamson
Films about mental health
Works by Jon Ronson
2010s English-language films
2010s British films